Harvey Holmes Russell (January 10, 1887 – January 8, 1980) was a Major League Baseball player. He batted left and threw right-handed.

He was born in Marshall, Virginia and died in Alexandria, Virginia.

External links

1887 births
1980 deaths
Major League Baseball catchers
Baltimore Terrapins players
Baseball players from Virginia
Minor league baseball managers
Bridgeport Orators players
Atlanta Crackers players
Bridgeport Crossmen players
New London Planters players
Pittsfield Hillies players
People from Marshall, Virginia